"Korobeiniki" is a nineteenth-century Russian folk song that tells the story of a meeting between a peddler and a girl, describing their haggling over goods in a metaphor for courtship.

Outside Russia, "Korobeiniki" is widely known as the Tetris theme tune, from its appearance in Nintendo's Game Boy version of the game (titled "A-Type") as arranged by the Japanese composer Hirokazu Tanaka in 1989.

History
The song "Korobeiniki" is based on a poem of the same name by Nikolay Nekrasov, which was first printed in the Sovremennik magazine in 1861. Its increasing tempo and the associated dance style led to it quickly becoming a popular Russian folk song.

Korobeiniki were peddlers with trays, who sold fabric, haberdashery, books and other small items in pre-revolutionary Russia. Nekrasov's much longer poem tells the story of a young peddler who seduces a peasant girl named Katya one night in a field of rye. He offers her some of his wares as gifts in exchange for a kiss and, as it is implied, sexual favours. She rejects all but one of his gifts, a turquoise ring, reasoning that having his wares but not him would be unbearable. The next morning, he pledges to marry her when he returns from selling his wares at the market. The song's narrative ends here; however, the poem concludes with the peddler being robbed and killed by a forest ranger whom he asks for directions while returning home with the profits made during his successful day at the market.

Melody

Lyrics

Critical reception 
The official Tetris website wrote that Korobeiniki was "memorable enough on its own as both a poem and folk tune", independent of its adaption into the Tetris theme.

Other arrangements of the song

After arrangements of "Korobeiniki" first appeared in Spectrum Holobyte's Apple IIGS and Mac versions of Tetris, the song was re-arranged in 1989 by Hirokazu Tanaka as the "Type A" accompaniment in Nintendo's Game Boy version 1.1. It has since become closely associated with the game in Western popular culture. In 2008, UGO listed the song as the 3rd best video game music of all time.

Though The Tetris Company holds a sound trademark on this variation of the song for use in video games, the song has appeared in Dance Maniax 2nd Mix under the title "Happy-hopper".

Adaptions and versions

Doctor Spin 

 Doctor Spin's 1992 novelty Eurodance cover version (under the name "Tetris") reached No. 6 on the UK singles chart.

Other versions 
 Tokyo Ska Paradise Orchestra has recorded and performed versions of the song under the title "Peddlers" (sometimes ベドラーズ "Pedorāzu") since their eponymous debut EP in 1989. Most recently it can be found on their "Ska Me Forever" (2014) album.
 The string quartet Bond included a version on their 2000 debut album Born called Korobushka which they often perform at their live concerts.
 American rock band Ozma released a rock version on their 2001 album The Doubble Donkey Disc, used in 2013 on the movie Kick Ass 2.
 An Italian house remix of the song called "Cammino Contento" was featured in the 2005 compilation album by Gigi D'Agostino, Disco Tanz.
 A remix of Korobeiniki plays during High Rank of Tire & Ice level in Crash Tag Team Racing.
A version of the song is used for the Nintendo Wii's video game Super Smash Bros. Brawl, in a part of the game related to Tetris. Arranged by Yoko Shimomura. The song is retained in later versions of Smash Bros. as well.
 A trance cover arranged by Ryu* is featured on the Exit Trance release  under the title "Korobushka". The song was later included on his album Ageha as "Korobushka (Ryu*Remix)".
 The PlayStation Portable title Ape Escape Academy (Ape Academy in Europe) also features this song in one of the 'Camp-Side Fire' mini-games (essentially a short rhythm game-like sequence), also under the title 'Korobushka'.
 In 2006, Jablay, sung by Titi Kamal for original soundtrack of Mendadak Dangdut samples and slightly modifies Korobeiniki on chorus part.
 Canadian fingerstyle guitarist Ewan Dobson performs an acoustic guitar version of the song on his first album.
 The Timbers Army sings this melody with altered lyrics during Portland Timbers games, usually accompanied by a simple dance with a large visual effect.
 The German Techno Band Scooter used the melody for it in their song Whistling Dave from the 2007 album Jumping All Over the World.
A version by the duo Pig With The Face Of A Boy, known as "A Complete History of the Soviet Union as Told by a Humble Worker, Arranged to the Melody of Tetris", details a simplified telling of the tale of the Soviet Union, along with the two ending verses to the tune of the Game Over screen in Tetris.
 British folk-punk band The Mechanisms sample the song's melody on the third-to-last song of their first album Once Upon A Time (In Space), "No Happy Ending".
A version of this song was arranged for the game The End Is Nigh titled ??? – Korobeiniki (Russian Folk 1861) by video game composer team Ridiculon (Matthias Bossi and Jon Evans).
The music was rearranged by Vitali Klatschkov and Diana May for a promotional session by Ortel Mobile in 2021.
German band dArtagnan both used the music for their song Trink mein Freund and released a folk rock version of Korobeiniki (in Russian) in their 2022 album Felsenfest.

References

Russian folk songs
Lidia Ruslanova songs
Tetris
Video game theme songs
Sound trademarks
Year of song unknown
Songwriter unknown